Mohammed Al-Ghamdi (born 26 February 1992) is a Saudi Arabian professional footballer who plays as a right-back or centre-back for Saudi Pro League side Al-Taawoun.

Club career
Mohammed Al-Ghamdi began his career at hometown club Al-Bahah. He spent three years at the club from 2015 until 2018. On 14 June 2018, Al-Ghamdi joined First Division side Al-Ain. On 23 July 2019, Al-Ghamdi joined Ohod. On 19 October 2020, Al-Ghamdi joined Pro League side Al-Taawoun on a one-year loan. On 25 January 2021, Al-Ghamdi made his Pro League debut in the 3–1 win against Damac. On 18 February 2021, Al-Ghamdi made his first start in a 2–1 loss to Al-Ittihad. On 30 April 2021, Al-Ghamdi joined Al-Taawoun on a permanent deal. He signed a three-year contract with the club. On 25 August 2021, it was announced that Al-Ghamdi injured his ACL and was ruled out for the rest of the 2021–22 season. On 27 August 2022, a year after his injury, Al-Ghamdi made his return in a 2–0 away win against Al-Fateh.

References

External links
 

1992 births
Living people
People from Al-Bahah Province
Saudi Arabian footballers
Association football fullbacks
Association football defenders
Saudi Fourth Division players
Saudi First Division League players
Saudi Professional League players
Al-Ain FC (Saudi Arabia) players
Ohod Club players
Al-Taawoun FC players